The Fatal Strand is the third and final novel in the Tales from the Wyrd Museum series by Robin Jarvis.

Synopsis
The final chapter in the Wyrd Museum Trilogy sees Neil Chapman and Edie Dorkins returning exhausted following the events of the previous book at Glastonbury Tor, only to find all is not well at the museum. Having lost one of her sisters, Ursula is behaving suspiciously. The museum knows it is being violated and its past reincarnations blur together with the present, putting all those inside in danger. A final battle for the future of the world is coming, and the Wyrd museum is at the centre of the battleground, but it still has some help to give.

1998 British novels
British fantasy novels
Novels by Robin Jarvis
HarperCollins books